Mission China is a 2017 Indian Assamese-language action drama film directed by Zubeen Garg and produced by Garima Saikia Garg as well as Zubeen Garg himself under the banner of "Eye Creation Productions". The film features Zubeen Garg and Deeplina Deka in lead roles and Sattyakee D'com Bhuyan, Siddharth Nipon Goswami, Yankee Parashar, Parthasarathi Mahanta, Pabitra Rabha, Bibhuti Bhushan Hazarika, Tridib Lahon, Nabadweep Borgohain, Ragini Parashar and Bhashwati Bharati in supporting roles. Zubeen also wrote the script and screenplay for the film.

Cast
 Zubeen Garg as 'Colonel Goswami'
Pabitra Rabha as 'Lama'
 Deeplina Deka as 'Chayan', Colonel Goswami's love interest
 Siddharth Nipon Goswami as 'Sidd'
 Yankee Parashar as 'Ragini', Sidd's love interest
 Sattyakee D'com Bhuyan as 'D'com', an ex-sniper and a shooter
 Tridib Lahon as 'Spider', a bomb specialist
 Nabadweep Borgohain
 Parthasarathi Mahanta
 Bibhuti Bhushan Hazarika
 Bhashwati Bharati
 Ragini Parashar
 Priyanka Bharali & Debosmita Banerjee (Special Appearance in the song "Raat Jwale")

Production
Mission China is produced by Garima Saikia Garg and Zubeen Garg under the banner of "I Creation Productions". Mission China is shot in many exotic locations such as Mirza, Sikkim, Shillong, Dima Hasao, Tawang etc.

Release
Mission China was released on 8 September 2017 in Assam with nearly 168 daily screenings. The movie has gathered positive responses from fans. The movie is also scheduled to release in Mumbai, Pune, Delhi and Bangalore. The movie was scheduled to release in Bengali in December 2017. Zubeen Garg says that he is planning to make another part of Mission China and invest more than ₹ 4 crores this time.

Box office
The fourth day collection was  39 lakh and that of the fifth day was  39 lakh. A total of  2 crore 40 lakh were collected within the first week.

Mission China has also beaten the first-day collection record of blockbuster Baahubali and Salman Khan’s Bajrangi Bhaijaan by a considerable margin in Assam.

Soundtrack
The film contains six songs sung by Zubeen Garg, Nachiketa Chakraborty, Joi Barua, Amit Paul, Siddharth Hazarika, Rohit Sonar, Zublee, Satabdi Borah, Mrinmoyee Goswami and Turi. The lyrics of the songs are written by Zubeen Garg, Sasanka Samir and Sumit Acharya. 

 The first music video of Mission China, "Din Jwole Raati Jwole" was released on 28 July 2017. It was well received by the listeners with the YouTube release having gathered around 1.9 lakh views within 24 hours of its release.

References

External links

2017 films
Films set in Assam
Indian action drama films
2017 action drama films
2010s Assamese-language films
Films shot in Meghalaya
Films shot in Shillong
Films shot in Assam
Films shot in Sikkim
Tawang Town
Indian Army in films
Films about insurgency in Northeast India
Northeast Indian films